The George Brown College of Applied Arts and Technology is a public, fully accredited college of applied arts and technology with three campuses in downtown Toronto  (Ontario, Canada). Like many other colleges in Ontario, George Brown College was chartered in 1966 by the government of Ontario and opened the next year.

Programs
George Brown offers more than 170 full-time programs in art and design, business, community services, early childhood education, construction and engineering technologies, health sciences, hospitality and culinary arts, preparatory studies, as well as specialized programs and services for recent immigrants and international students.

The college offers diploma programs, advanced diploma programs, as well as degree programs, two in conjunction with Toronto Metropolitan University. The college offers the following degrees:

Arts, Design & Information Technology 

 Honours Bachelor of Brand Design 
 Honours Bachelor of Digital Experience 

Business 

 Honours Bachelor of Commerce (Financial Services)
 Honours Bachelor of Business Administration (Business Analytics) 

Community Services & Early Childhood 

 Honours Bachelor of Interpretation (American Sign Language) 
 Early Childhood Education (consecutive diploma/degree) 
 Honours Bachelor of Early Childhood Leadership 

Construction & Engineering Technologies
 
 Honours Bachelor of Technology (Construction Management) 

Health Sciences 

 Honours Bachelor of Behaviour Analysis 
 Bachelor of Science in Nursing 
 Honours Bachelor of Science (Dental Hygiene) 

Hospitality & Culinary Arts 

 Honours Bachelor of Commerce (Culinary Management) 
 Honours Bachelor of Food Studies 
 Honours Bachelor of Business Administration (Hospitality) 

Graduate and certificate programs, pre-college and apprentice programs round out the college's full-time offerings. As of 2022, there are 180 continuing education certificates/designations available.

In 2021, there were 27,128 full-time students — 29 percent international students — as well as 3,123 part-time students and 58,119 continuing education registrants.

George Brown has 15,000 distance education students studying in over 35 countries.  One of the most popular distance education programs offered by the college is its award-winning Electronics Technician distance education program, developed by Dr. Colin Simpson.

George Brown was named one of the Greater Toronto's Top Employers for 2022.

In 2022, George Brown College was ranked among the top 10 research colleges in the country, ranking 8th for overall research income, and ranking 4th for both the number of paid students and for the number of completed projects. Research Infosource, which publishes annual rankings reports on research and development at institutions across Canada, released the results for the top 50 colleges in January 2022.

History
The college was established during the formation of Ontario's community college system in 1967.  Colleges of Applied Arts and Technology were established on May 21, 1965. The college is named after George Brown, who was an important 19th-century politician and newspaper publisher (he founded the Toronto Globe, forerunner to The Globe and Mail) and was one of the Fathers of Confederation.

The college's predecessor, the Provincial Institute of Trades (PIT), was founded in 1951 to offer apprentice training on behalf of the provincial Department of Labour. In 1952, the PIT began operation at 21 Nassau Street in Toronto's Kensington Market and, after expanding with the construction of two additional buildings on the site, was offering programs in lathing and structural steel, barbering, diesel mechanics, jewellery arts, watchmaking and welding by 1961. In 1962 the province opened the Provincial Institute of Trades and Occupations (PITO), a sister training institute, at 555 Davenport Road near Casa Loma.

When George Brown College was formed in 1967, it absorbed both the PIT and PITO and opened its Kensington and Casa Loma campuses at the two institutes' former facilities. George Brown College also went on to absorb, in 1969, four former Toronto Board of Education Adult Education Centres in a third campus at 507 College Street and, in 1973, five Toronto-area Schools of Nursing in 1973, including: St. Joseph's, St. Michael's, Toronto General,  Atkinson (Toronto Western) and Nightingale.

In 1973, a new expanded Casa Loma campus was opened. In 1976, the St. James Campus opened at 200 King Street East in buildings formerly belonging to Christie Bakery and Hallmark Cards.

The Hospitality building (300 Adelaide E.) opened at St. James Campus in 1987, the same year that the College Street Campus closed. Kensington Campus closed in 1994.

Presidents

 Gervan Fearon 2021 - present
 Anne Sado 2004 - 2021
 Frank Sorochinsky 1994 - 2004
 John Rankin 1991 - 1995
 D.E. Light 1978 – 1991
 C.C. Lloyd 1968 - 1978

Casa Loma campus

Casa Loma campus is situated on the stretch of Kendal Ave. between Davenport Rd. and MacPherson Ave. Nearby features include Casa Loma, and the City of Toronto Archives. The campus itself is a collection of five buildings.

In 2004, the old and mostly unused A building was torn down due to health concerns and to create a green space on campus. Students attending classes in building A were experiencing illness, thought to be due to sick building syndrome. There is a moose sculpture in the green space.

St. James campus

St. James campus consists of five buildings. The first is a large brick building at 200 King St. E. The second and third are located at 290 and 300 Adelaide St. East and are connected. They are home to Financial services, Creative Arts, Business Administration and the faculty of Centre for Hospitality and Culinary Arts. This campus is where the chef school is located.

Waterfront campus

In September 2012, George Brown opened the Waterfront Campus located at 51 Dockside Dr., south of Queen's Quay between Jarvis and Parliament Streets (between Corus Quay and Redpath Sugar Refinery). This campus is home to the Centre for Health Sciences. In 2019, the college expanded its Waterfront Campus to the Daniels Waterfront - City of the Arts complex at 3 Lower Jarvis St. - home to the School of Design. And the latest Waterfront Campus expansion, Limberlost Place, is set to open at 185 Queens Quay E. in 2025. The 10-storey tall-wood, mass-timber building will be the first institutional building of its kind in Ontario and will house the School of Architectural Studies and the School of Computer Technology. It will also house a research institute and a child care centre.

Toronto Metropolitan University campus

This associate campus is in the Sally Horsfall Eaton building (SHE building) at Toronto Metropolitan University. The address is 99 Gerrard St. E.

George Brown also has classes from the Early Childhood Education, Early Childhood Assistant and Activation Coordinator Gerontology programs at the Sally Horsfall Eaton (SHE) Building at TMU (located at the corner of Gould St and Mutual St.).

Young Centre for the Performing Arts

The Theatre School at George Brown College presents a season of productions at the Young Centre for the Performing Arts in the Distillery District in downtown Toronto.
It is a brand-new theatre built into 1800s-era Victorian industrial buildings, with the incorporation of additional teaching facilities.
The theatre arts program enjoys a partnership with the Tarragon Theatre and Soulpepper Theatre Company.

Student Residence, The George
George Brown’s student residence, The George, opened in 2016. Located at 80 Cooperage St. E., near Cherry and Front streets, close to Toronto’s Distillery District, the building was part of the 2015 Pan Am/Para Pan Am Games Athletes Village before George Brown took ownership. 

The building also houses the Lucie and Thornton Blackburn Conference Centre. The facility is named after a wife and husband who escaped slavery and established Toronto’s first cab company, helped found the Little Trinity Anglican Church and worked on anti-slavery initiatives. Their story is told in a student-created mural at the conference centre.

Sports
The school's team name is the Huskies, and varsity sports include:
 Badminton  
 Baseball
 Basketball 
 Cross Country
 Esports
 Indoor Soccer
 Soccer
 Volleyball

The volleyball team has been coached by, among others, Olympian Sam Schachter.

Media
The Dialog is the student newspaper on campus and is a service provided by the Student Association of George Brown College, The Dialog is a member of CUP.

Libraries
George Brown College students have access to several libraries:
 341 King St. Library Learning Commons
 Casa Loma Library Learning Commons
 Centre for Hospitality & Culinary Arts e-Library
 Toronto Metropolitan University – Sally Horsfall Eaton Academic Resource Centre
 St. James Library Learning Commons
 Waterfront Library Learning Commons
 Sunnybrook Health Science Centre Library – Orthotics & Prosthetics Collection

Each of the college libraries primarily house materials suitable for the programs taught at their respective campuses.

Students, faculty and staff have access to an extensive range of electronic resources including, ebooks, articles, and image databases. These are available for use in the library and remotely.

Notable alumni 

 Hannah Emily Anderson, actress
 Katherine Barrell, actress, writer, producer, director
 Samantha Bee, comedian, writer, actress, television host
 Shaun Benson, actor
 Ryder Britton, actor
 Robin Brûlé, actress
 Valerie Buhagiar, actress, film director
 Darwyn Cooke, comics artist, writer, cartoonist, animator
 Lynn Crawford, television chef
 Christine Cushing, television personality
 Mary Jo Eustace, actress, singer, chef
 Natasha Falle, activist, professor, abolitionist
 John Henry, politician
 Simin Keramati, multidisciplinary artist
 Daniel MacIvor, actor, playwright, theatre director, film director
 Dan MacKenzie, sports and marketing executive
 Michael Mahonen, actor, director, screenwriter
 Mark McEwan, celebrity chef
 Keith Mondesir, Saint Lucian politician
 Roger Mooking, chef, musician, TV host
 Jayde Nicole, model
 Aaron Poole, actor
 Rob Rainford, television chef, broadcaster
 Ted Reader, chef, author
 Lou Rinaldi, politician, entrepreneur
 Gigi Gorgeous, YouTube personality
 Michael Smith, Chef
 Aliyah, WWE Superstar

See also
 Higher education in Ontario
 List of colleges in Ontario

References

External links

 

 
Universities and colleges in Toronto
Educational institutions established in 1967
Education in Toronto
Colleges in Ontario
1967 establishments in Ontario
Hospitality schools
Cooking schools in North America